Edges of Darkness is a 2008 American direct to video horror film directed by Jason Horton and Blaine Cade. The plot is about three interconnected tales of terror set against the backdrop of a zombie apocalypse.

Plot 
Edges of Darkness tells the tales of three groups of survivors held up in an apartment complex during a zombie apocalypse. With their food supply dwindling, a vampire couple kidnaps a young girl. They intend to bleed her slowly to survive, but things don't go exactly as planned. Dean, an obsessed horror writer is holed up with his neglected wife, Dana. Dean keeps his sanity by burying himself in his writing. He installs a new processor to run his computer on their limited generator power, but soon finds out there's a high price to pay. Heather, a survival nut, rescues a young mother and her son from a horde of zombies. She takes them back to the complex. However, she soon discovers the mother and son are on the run from a group of renegade priests hellbent on destroying the boy.

Cast 
 Alonzo F. Jones as Stan
 Shamika Ann Franklin as Stellie
 Annemarie Pazmino as Natalie
 Lee Perkins as Paul
 Michelle Rose as Heather
 Xavier Jones as Marcus
 Jay Costelo as Dean
 Alisha Gaddis as Dana
 Robert Kitchen as Priest
 Wayne Baldwin as Morris
 Damon Burks as Daemon

Production 
Shooting ended in February 2007, and it was tested in June 2007.  Post-production was slowed by difficulties in scoring the film; after six months of delays, it finished in February 2008.

Release 
Edges of Darkness played on United Kingdom television station Zone Horror in 2009.  Anchor Bay Entertainment released it on DVD on September 22, 2009.

Reception 
Reviews of the video were mixed. Beyondhollywood.com stated in its review, "[Edges of Darkness is] not really anything above a B-level, straight-to-video product...Low budget films aren't usually known for their award-winning dialogue or fine acting, and Edges of Darkness conforms to the standard. The dialogue never feels "real," and the acting is pretty wooden. That said, I can see several of these actors advancing in their careers." Mike Phalin of Dread Central was more positive; he rated Edges of Darkness 3 out of 5 stars and said, "When thinking back on Edges of Darkness, the positives far outweigh the bad. The independent film market is flooded with flops that don't try in the least to break new ground, but Jason Horton and his crew created something that breathes life into a tired and clichéd subgenre. Edges of Darkness is certainly an anthology that should be expanded as it employs many creative ideas and a cast of memorable characters." Peter Dendle called the stories "thin and unconnected" though an improvement over Rise of the Undead.

References

External links 
 
 

2008 films
American science fiction horror films
2008 independent films
2000s science fiction horror films
American zombie films
American independent films
American post-apocalyptic films
2000s English-language films
2000s American films